Cythara polygona is an extinct species of sea snail, a marine gastropod mollusk in the family Mangeliidae.

This species is considered a nomen dubium.

Description

Distribution
This extinct marine species was found in Miocene and Pliocene strata in the Dominican Republic; age range: 7.246 to 3.6 Ma

References

 C. J. Maury. 1917. Santo Domingo type sections and fossils. Bulletins of American Paleontology 5(30): 1–43

External links
  Gabb, William M. On the topography and geology of Santo Domingo. M'Calla & Stavely, printers, 1873
 Fossilworks: Cythara polygona 

polygona
Gastropods described in 1873